Erik Odelberg (13 March 1889 – 26 October 1938) was a Swedish sports shooter. He competed in two events at the 1912 Summer Olympics.

References

1889 births
1938 deaths
Swedish male sport shooters
Olympic shooters of Sweden
Shooters at the 1912 Summer Olympics
Sport shooters from Stockholm